Wittrockia superba is a plant species in the genus Wittrockia.

The bromeliad is endemic to the Atlantic Forest biome (Mata Atlantica Brasileira), located in southeastern Brazil. It is native within Paraná (state), Rio de Janeiro (state), Santa Catarina (state), and São Paulo (state).

It is an Endangered species in its natural habitats.

References

superba
Endemic flora of Brazil
Flora of the Atlantic Forest
Flora of Paraná (state)
Flora of Rio de Janeiro (state)
Flora of Santa Catarina (state)
Flora of São Paulo (state)
Endangered flora of South America